The Nicholas-Beazley Pobjoy Special  aka the Nicholas-Beazley Phantom I, aka the Wittman Phantom, aka the Flagg Phantom, aka the Reaver Special was a world record holding air racer of the 1930s

Development
The Nicholas-Beazley Airplane Company had imported a Pobjoy Airmotors engine with a gear reduction unit for use in its new design the Nicholas-Beazley NB-3. Designer Robert T. Jones computed the weight and balance for the setup and proposed a new design as an air-racer. Claude Flagg and H. F. Landis built the aircraft in their spare time and patented the wing design.

Design
The fuselage is welded steel with fabric covering. The wings used an early application of lightweight aluminum construction with U shaped cantilever spars with wire bracing and fabric covering. The aircraft used wheels with small tires and without brakes. The cockpit was open and the engine was fully cowled.

In 1932 the Pobjoy P engine was replaced with a Pobjoy R of 75 hp. The cockpit was also enclosed. In 1933 Wittman lengthened the fuselage by 21 inches, removed the engine cowling and modified the rudder. In 1946 The engine was replaced with a Continental C-85.

Operational history
In 1932 Ownership passed to Air Racer Steve Wittman. An Air Commerce inspector fronted the money, and had Wittman race the aircraft to avoid a conflict of interest. The Pobjoy Special is the only racer Wittman raced that he did not build or design himself. In 1937 the Pobjoy Special is flipped on its back. It was rebuilt sold, and stored until the end of World War II. John Reaver entered the aircraft as the Reaver Special in the new Goodyear Formula One races.

1930 National Air Races - Registered as R1W, pilot Danny Fowlie reached 115 mph placing third in class with a mismatched prop.
1933 Chicago International Air Races - Pilot Steve Wittman wins all races in the 200ci class with a maximum speed of 120 mph.
1934 New Orleans - Wittman wins the 100 km world speed record of 137.513 mph for aircraft less than 440 pounds.
1934 Cleveland Air Races - Wittman wins all races in the 200ci class with a speed of 129.440 mph.
1935 Cleveland Air Races - New owner Percy V. Chaffee wins all races in 200ci class.
In 1936 the 200ci class is eliminated, making the Pobjoy Special obsolete for racing.
1937 St.Louis - Last race of the Pobjoy Special.

Variants
 In 1998 former owner, Dick Sampson, commissioned an airworthy replica of the Pobjoy Special to be built by Bill Turner of Repeat Aviation. It is configured with the Wittman modifications, a cowled Pobjoy engine, and wooden wings. The aircraft is on display at the EAA Airventure Museum in Oshkosh, Wisconsin.

Specifications (Pobjoy Special)

Bibliography
 Ogden, Bob. Aviation Museums and Collections of North America. 2007. Air-Britain (Historians) Ltd. .

References

1930s United States aircraft
Racing aircraft
Single-engined tractor aircraft
Aircraft first flown in 1930